Elisabetta Biavaschi (born 26 June 1973) is an Italian former alpine skier who competed in the 1998 Winter Olympics.

References

External links
 

1973 births
Living people
Italian female alpine skiers
Olympic alpine skiers of Italy
Alpine skiers at the 1998 Winter Olympics
People from Chiavenna
Sportspeople from the Province of Sondrio